Franco Pedroni (13 September 1926 – 12 February 2001) was an Italian professional footballer and manager who played as a midfielder or as a defender.

Playing career
As a footballer, Pedroni made his debut in Serie A while playing with Como during the 1949–50 season. Later, he signed for Milan, winning 1954–55 championship, and also played for Alessandria.

Coaching career
Pedroni's first experiences as coach were with Alessandria, where he managed the team together with Luciano Robotti. He was young Gianni Rivera's mentor.

He later managed some teams in lower divisions.

References

1926 births
2001 deaths
Sportspeople from the Province of Varese
Italian footballers
Serie A players
Serie B players
Serie A managers
Italian football managers
Como 1907 players
A.C. Milan players
U.S. Alessandria Calcio 1912 players
F.C. Pro Vercelli 1892 players
Casale F.B.C. managers
Association football defenders
Association football midfielders
S.G. Gallaratese A.S.D. players
Footballers from Lombardy